In computing, a device control register is a hardware register that controls some computer hardware device, for example a peripheral or an expansion card.

Specific technologies use this terminology with a narrower meaning:
 The ISA PNP specification divides the registers of a device in two categories: control registers and configuration registers. One of the device control registers defined by ISA PNP is (for example) the Activate register, which turns the card on or off.
 The Device Control Register is also the name of a specific register in the PCI Express architecture. It has fields that (among other things) control what is the maximum read request size (in bytes) that the device can make.
 Device Control Register (DCR) is also the name of an IBM proprietary bus. Its stated design goal is to "transfer data between a DCR master, typically a CPU’s general purpose registers, and the DCR slave logic’s device control registers". For example, the IBM MultiProcessor Interrupt Controller (MPIC) is connected up to four processors via a shared DCR bus, and in turn the MPIC handles up to 128 interrupt sources.

References 

Computing terminology